Boillot is a surname. Notable people with the surname include:

 André Boillot ( 1891–1932), French auto racing driver
 Georges Boillot (1884–1916), French Grand Prix motor racing driver and World War I fighter pilot

See also 
 Boillot & Lauck, US architectural partnership and business duo